Andrew Bolton (born 22 January 1970) is an English powerlifter and strongman who was born in Dewsbury, Yorkshire. He is the first man to deadlift 1,000 pounds, doing so in 2006.

Career
Bolton won his first powerlifting competition in 1991 when he was twenty-one years of age, at a local powerlifting event called the BAWLA Yorkshire Junior Championships. Bolton has since competed in the WPO/WPC. He is the current World Powerlifting Organization "world record holder" in the total (1273 kg/2806 lb). Bolton also holds the current WPO world records in the squat (550.5 kg/1213 lb) and was the previous holder of the deadlift (457.5 kg/1008.6 lb), and was the first to demonstrate a deadlift of over a thousand pounds.

Bolton has also competed in strongman contests. His strongman accomplishments include placing fifth in the 2002 Arnold Strongman Classic.

Powerlifting official competition records:

equipped

Squat - 1213 lbs/550.5 kg (multi ply)
Bench Press - 727.5 lbs/330 kg (multi ply)
Deadlift - 1008.6 lbs/457.5 kg (multi ply)

raw

Squat - 838 lbs/380 kg (single ply)
Bench Press - 600.8 lbs/272.5 kg (single ply)
Deadlift - 964.5 lbs/437.5 kg (raw)

Deadlift
Bolton is best known for being the first man to lift a 1,000 lb. deadlift (equipped) in a powerlifting competition. Bolton appeared in October 2010 at Elizabethtown High School at "The Night of the Living Dead" deadlift competition where he deadlifted 964.5 lbs raw in only a pair of pants and a striking pair of socks.

In 2012, Bolton published a deadlift training book Deadlift Dynamite in collaboration with Pavel Tsatsouline.

References

External links 

 
Andy Bolton Bio
Andrew Bolton The Phase That Launched 1000 Lbs online

British powerlifters
English strength athletes
British strength athletes
1970 births
Living people